Pyotr Nikolayevich Kropotkin (November 24, 1910, Moscow – 17 January 1996, Moscow) was a Soviet Russian geologist, tectonician, and geophysicist. 

Kropotkin came from an aristocratic family, he was the grand-nephew of the anarchist prince Peter Kropotkin.

His main publications were devoted to tectonics and its relationships with magmatism and to tectonigeophysical problems. He developed the theory of the Earth's outgassing and abyssal inorganic origin of petroleum and coined the terms "cold outgassing" as well as "degassing column" later known in the West as chimneys concept.

Kropotkin graduated from Moscow Geological Exploration Institute (MGRI) in 1932. He took part in prospecting for oil in the West Urals. Since 1936 he was with Geological Institute of Russian Academy of Sciences (RAS). He was elected a RAS Academician in 1992 and was awarded the Demidov Prize in 1994. His son, Aleksandr Kropotkin is a prominent Russian Geoephysicist.

Selected publications
Kropotkin P.N., 1955. Problems of oil genesis. Soviet Geology Jour., no. 47. pp. 104-125 (in Russian)
Kropotkin P.N. and Shakhvarstova K.A., 1959. Solid bitumens, oil, and combustible gases in hyperbasite intrusions, traps, and volacinic pipes. In: Problems of oil migration and formation of oil and gas accumulations. - Moscow, GosTopTechIzdat. - pp. 151-164 (in Russian)
Kropotkin P.N., 1986. Earth's outgassing and genesis of hydrocarbons. Mendeleev All-Union Chem. Soc. Jour. – Moscow, [Khimiya] Chemistry, vol. XXXI (5). – pp. 540-546 (in Russian)
Kropotkin P.N., 1992. Inorganic origin of oil and combustible gases. Earth and Universe Jour., no. 1. - pp. 23-29 (in Russian)

See also
Abiogenic petroleum origin

External links
Featured story about P.N. Kropotkin (in Russian)

Soviet geophysicists
Soviet geologists
Rurikids
1910 births
1996 deaths
Corresponding Members of the USSR Academy of Sciences
Full Members of the Russian Academy of Sciences
Demidov Prize laureates